is a former Japanese football player and manager.

Playing career
Sembiki was born in Kitakyushu on January 5, 1964. After graduating from Kyushu Kyoritsu University, he joined Japan Soccer League club Yomiuri in 1985. Although he played many matches as left side back in 1986-87 season, he could not become a regular player behind Satoshi Tsunami. He moved to NKK in 1990 and played many matches. In 1992, Japan Soccer League was folded and founded new league J1 League. He moved to J1 League club Urawa Reds in 1992. However he could not play in the match. From 1993, he played for NEC Yamagata (1993–94) and his local club Fukuoka Blux (1995). He retired end of 1995 season.

Coaching career
After retirement, Sembiki managed Avispa Fukuoka (former Fukuoka Blux) youth team (1996–99) and his alma mater Kyushu Kyoritsu University (2000–02). In 2003, he signed with Sagan Tosu. Although he managed the club, the club won only 3 matches out of 44 matches and he resigned end of 2003 season. In 2005, he signed with his local club New Wave Kitakyushu in Regional Leagues. He managed the club until end of 2006 season.

Club statistics

Managerial statistics

References

External links

jsgoal.jp

1964 births
Living people
Kyushu Kyoritsu University alumni
Association football people from Fukuoka Prefecture
Japanese footballers
Japan Soccer League players
J1 League players
Japan Football League (1992–1998) players
Tokyo Verdy players
NKK SC players
Urawa Red Diamonds players
Montedio Yamagata players
Avispa Fukuoka players
Japanese football managers
J2 League managers
Sagan Tosu managers
Association football defenders